António Raposo Tavares o Velho (Portuguese: the old one) (1598–1658) was a Portuguese colonial bandeirante who explored mainland eastern South America and claimed it for Portugal, extending the territory of the colony beyond the limits imposed by the treaty of Tordesillas. He also led the largest expedition ever made in the Americas, covering over 10,000 kilometres (over 6,200 mi) around South America, unifying completely the two large South American river basins and the Andes in a single voyage. Raposo Tavares departed from São Paulo towards the rivers of the Río de la Plata Basin (mainly the Paraguay River) and the Andean slopes, and from there to Belém, at the mouth of the Amazon. Raposo Tavares was partly of Jewish origin according to the Jewish historian Anita Novinsky.

Biography
Tavares was born in São Miguel do Pinheiro, Alentejo, Portugal in 1598. He sailed for South America in 1618 with his father Fernão Vieira Tavares.
In 1622, after his father died, he settled around São Paulo; six years later, in 1628, he left the village with the first bandeira composed of 900 settlers and 2000 Tupi warriors.
This voyage was started to hunt the heretics down and to capture more indigenous slaves (mostly Tupi, Tememinos and Carijós). The bandeirantes first attacked some Guarani villages in the upper Parana valley, which were protected by the Spanish Jesuits and brutally killed many people, capturing 2500 Indians. This journey allowed the annexation of a portion of the land east of the Uruguay River (current states of Paraná and Santa Catarina) to the Portuguese colony.

Tavares went back to São Paulo in 1633 and he became a judge. Three years later he left again on a new journey, this time to destroy the Spanish Jesuit settlements established southeast of the Uruguay River (current Rio Grande do Sul).
From 1639 to 1642, Tavares fought along with the military which was engaged in war against the Dutch, who had conquered the settlements in the north-eastern coast (Bahia and Pernambuco).

He embarked on his last journey with a bandeira in 1648, searching for gold, precious minerals and slaves in the unexplored mainland. He was joined by 200 white mercenaries from São Paulo and over a thousand Indians. The bandeirantes travelled for over  following the courses of the rivers, most notably the Paraguay River, the Grande River, the Mamoré River, the Madeira River and the Amazon River. Only Tavares, 59 whites and some Indians reached Belém at the mouth of the Amazon River. After that, the survivors returned to São Paulo, where Raposo Tavares died in 1658.

References

External links
Antônio Raposo Tavares, Encyclopædia Britannica online

Portuguese explorers of South America
Explorers of Amazonia
17th-century explorers
1598 births
1658 deaths
Colonial Brazil
People from Mértola
Portuguese people of Jewish descent
Portuguese colonization of the Americas
17th-century Brazilian people
17th-century Portuguese people
1630s in Brazil
1640s in South America
1650s in South America